Johnny Abarrientos (born July 17, 1970) is a Filipino retired professional basketball player in the Philippine Basketball Association. He was also a many-time member of the Philippine National team, and was the 1996 PBA Most Valuable Player, becoming the shortest player to win the league's highest individual award. He is known by many as The Flying A when he started playing for the Alaska Milkmen in 1993. He is currently an assistant coach for the Magnolia Hotshots and the Head Coach for the FEU Tamaraws.

Amateur career 
Abarrientos began his basketball career in the University Athletic Association of the Philippines for the Far Eastern University Tamaraws alongside future pro Victor Pablo and led the Tamaraws to two UAAP crowns in 1991 and 1992. His jersey #14 was retired by FEU on July 6, 2011.

He also played in the Philippine Basketball League for the Crispa Redmanizers and Triple-V before jumping ship to the PBA.

Professional career

Alaska Aces 
Alaska selected Abarrientos 3rd overall in the 1993 PBA Draft and showed impressive performances in his rookie season. In his second season, he was included in the RP National team bound for the 1994 Asian Games held in Hiroshima, Japan.

From 1994-1998, Abarrientos led Alaska to eight PBA titles, including the grand slam winning 1996 season. He was named as the Most Valuable Player during the same season and the Best Player of the Conference in the Commissioner's Cup.

In 1997, talks of Abarrientos' potential participation in the NBA came, when Charlotte Hornets scout Joe Bettancourt offered Abarrientos a contract to participate in the Hornets' pre-season camp. Abarrientos, though, declined the offer to concentrate on his pro career in the PBA. In 1997 Abarrientos average a career high 16.7 Points and a league leading 8.6 assists per game.

In 1998, Abarrientos was included in the Philippine Centennial Team, coached by his Alaska mentor Tim Cone. With him, Alvin Patrimonio and fellow Alaska teammates Kenneth Duremdes, Bong Hawkins and Jojo Lastimosa, the Nationals took home the bronze medal in the Bangkok Asian Games.

Two years later, Abarrientos was named in the PBA's 25 Greatest Players of All-Time as part of the league's anniversary on April 9, 2000. During the same year, Abarrientos' career started to diminish despite the Aces winning the All-Filipino crown. After the season, Abarrientos and Poch Juinio were swapped to the Pop Cola Panthers for Ali Peek and Jon Ordonio.

Pop Cola Panthers 

Abarrientos put on a decent performance in his only season with the Panthers in 2001. With Rudy Hatfield and former Alaska teammates Lastimosa and Juinio around, they led Pop Cola to a third-place finish in the All-Filipino Cup. After the year, Pop Cola was bought by the San Miguel Corporation and was renamed as the Coca-Cola Tigers.

Coca-Cola Tigers 
Prior to joining the Tigers in 2002, Abarrientos was part of the RP Training Pool for the Busan Asian Games but was later cut. He returned later to lead Coca-Cola to a third-place finish in the Governor's Cup. In the All-Filipino, Abarrientos led his team to the finals against Alaska. After he scored 20 points in the first half of Game 1, Abarrientos left the game with an injury and was sidelined for the rest of the series. The Tigers went on to win the crown 3-1 over his former team.

In 2003, Abarrientos and his team led the Tigers to the 2003 Reinforced Conference title. By the 2004-2005 season, injuries and decline have hampered Abarrientos and saw his minutes diminished. In the 2005-2006 season, Abarrientos shared point guard duties with fellow FEU alumni, rookie Dennis Miranda and Dale Singson.

Barangay Ginebra Kings 
Two weeks before the start of the PBA season, the Coca-Cola Tigers released Abarrientos. Rumors persisted that his former team Alaska and Ginebra were interested in acquiring him. Five days after his release, Abarrientos was signed by Coke's sister team Ginebra to a contract for the 2006-07 season after none of the non-SMC teams showed interest in signing the former 1996 MVP.

He played reserve role to lead point guard and 2009 Most Valuable Player Jayjay Helterbrand, as his court generalship gave additional factor in the Kings' line-up. The Flying A made a memorable moment when he surpassed Ramon Fernandez as the all-time leader in steals on February 5, 2007 as Ginebra defeated the Talk 'N Text Phone Pals and won their semis matchup, 4-2. Ginebra would go on to win the 2006-07 Philippine Cup against San Miguel, 4-2, with Abarrientos hitting a three-pointer in a crucial stretch of the final game.

Afterwards, Abarrientos went into semi-retirement, serving in the coaching staff of Ginebra. Before the 2009-2010 PBA season started, he announced his retirement, ending his very successful 16 years in the PBA. But, during the KFC Philippine Cup 2009-10 of the PBA, when Celino Cruz, Jayjay Helterbrand and Mark Caguioa got injured, Head Coach Jong Uichico brought back Abarientos to the active roster as point guard.

Retirement and coaching 

After Abarrientos was elevated as assistant coach of the Barangay Ginebra Kings, he was invited by Alaska management for the Alaska 25th Anniversary Reunion as a result of their triumphant title conquest in the 2010 PBA Fiesta Conference against the San Miguel Beermen. In that occasion, Alaska management decided to retire his #14 jersey because of his valuable contributions to the team including his 1996 Grand Slam conquest and his MVP award during that same year.

The 1996 PBA MVP had spent the last few years as part of the coaching staff of Ginebra. For the 37th season of the PBA, Abarrientos joins the B-Meg team as assistant coach, together with former teammate Jeffrey Cariaso, to help Coach Tim Cone install his vaunted triangle offense in the talent-laden B-Meg squad.

Accomplishments 
 UAAP Champion
 1996 PBA MVP
 12-Time PBA Champion
 Three-Time Member of the RP National Team
 PBA All Time Leaders in Steals (1,302)

References

External links
Johnny Abarrientos Player Profile

1970 births
Living people
Alaska Aces (PBA) draft picks
Alaska Aces (PBA) players
Asian Games bronze medalists for the Philippines
Asian Games medalists in basketball
Barangay Ginebra San Miguel players
Basketball players at the 1994 Asian Games
Basketball players at the 1998 Asian Games
Basketball players from Camarines Sur
FEU Tamaraws basketball players
Filipino men's basketball coaches
Filipino men's basketball players
Medalists at the 1998 Asian Games
Philippine Basketball Association All-Stars
Barangay Ginebra San Miguel coaches
Philippine Basketball Association players with retired numbers
Philippines men's national basketball team players
Point guards
Pop Cola Panthers players
Powerade Tigers players
Sportspeople from Naga, Camarines Sur
Magnolia Hotshots coaches
FEU Tamaraws basketball coaches